Judge Blumenfeld may refer to:

Mosher Joseph Blumenfeld (1904–1988), judge of the United States District Court for the District of Connecticut
Stanley Blumenfeld (born 1962), judge of the United States District Court for the Central District of California